Whistling Straits is one of two 36-hole links-style golf courses associated with Destination Kohler, a luxury golf resort owned and operated by the Kohler Company in Kohler, Wisconsin. The other course is Blackwolf Run, located in the Village of Kohler. The Whistling Straits complex is located north of Sheboygan, in the unincorporated community of Haven in the Town of Mosel in Sheboygan County. Whistling Straits is separated into two courses, the Straits Course and the Irish Course.

The courses at Whistling Straits (and Blackwolf Run) were designed by Pete and Alice Dye.

Straits Course
The Straits Course is the flagship course at Whistling Straits. It hosted the 2004 PGA Championship, the 2007 U.S. Senior Open, and the 2010 PGA Championship. The course hosted the PGA Championship for a third time in 2015 and the 2021 Ryder Cup was held on the course with the United States winning 19-9.

The Straits Course replicates the ancient seaside links courses of the United Kingdom and Ireland. It has vast rolling greens, deep pot bunkers, grass-topped dunes and winds that sweep in off the lake. Being a coastal links-style course, there are few large trees or woods on the course, which is open and exposed to wind and the elements.

Before the course was built, the property was an abandoned airfield called Camp Haven (1949–1959), with a stream running through the middle. Wisconsin Electric purchased the property in the 1970s and attempted to build the Haven Nuclear Power Plant on the property, but its construction was opposed by local residents and Wisconsin Power & Light (Sheboygan County's major electric utility), and the company never built the plant. It then sold the property to the Kohler Company in the early 1990s.

Kohler Company CEO Herbert Kohler hired the Dyes to be the course architects. During construction, the original landscape of the Straits Course was covered with about 800,000 cubic yards (610,000 m3) of dirt and sand.

Hiroshi Iwata holds the course record for the Straits Course with a 63 in the second round of the 2015 PGA Championship.

Irish Course
The second course at Whistling Straits is the Irish Course, an inland grass-and-dune layout. It is a par-72 course that features  of golf from the longest tees, with a course rating of 75.6 and a slope rating of 146. Also designed by Pete Dye, it opened for play in 2000. The course record of 67 was shot by Mike Frechette in 2007 and then matched by Garret Buckley at the 2014 Whistling Straits Intercollegiate.

Major tournaments hosted

Course layout

Straits Course

Previous course lengths for major championships:
  – par 72, 2010 PGA Championship
  – par 72, 2004 PGA Championship

Irish Course

References

External links

Kohler Company
Golf clubs and courses in Wisconsin
Golf clubs and courses designed by Pete Dye
Ryder Cup venues
Buildings and structures in Sheboygan County, Wisconsin
Tourist attractions in Sheboygan County, Wisconsin
1998 establishments in Wisconsin